Hidden is a 2015 American  psychological thriller film written and directed by the Duffer Brothers in their feature film debut. The film stars Alexander Skarsgård, Andrea Riseborough, and Emily Alyn Lind. This was producer Richard D. Zanuck's last film; he died before filming began.

Plot  
An unknown strange outbreak has devastated the United States. A family of three, Ray (Alexander Skarsgård), Claire (Andrea Riseborough) and their daughter Zoe (Emily Alyn Lind), have taken refuge in an abandoned fallout shelter shortly after the catastrophe to hide from the monsters outside. Zoe wakes one night after having a nightmare of the 'Breathers'. The family has difficulty coping in their cramped environment but manage by having a set of rules, such as always keeping calm and never leaving the shelter. The three soon discover at dinner that their already dwindling rations are also being consumed by a rat and try to find and kill it. The family also discovers that the rat managed to sneak into the shelter through an opening other than the main barricaded hatch. They find a small air duct but Ray reassures Zoe that the Breathers wouldn't be able to fit through the duct. They believe they may be the only ones left alive. The Breathers have been actively hunting down the family, and have nearly located them multiple times. Claire and Ray's priority is to keep Zoe alive, regardless of what happens to them.

In a flashback, it is the beginning of the outbreak, 301 days ago. After the start of outbreak, Ray, Claire and Zoe drive along a highway fleeing their town, Kingsville, only to be stopped with many other people by the CDC. Signs all around state that they are under quarantine.

Claire kills the rat but in the process, Ray accidentally knocks over one of their lamps, burning a wooden table. Having put out the fire, the family quickly realizes that the smoke produced from the fire is drifting up the air duct, giving away their position to anyone in the area. Later they discover that the smoke has left ash covered all above their shelter hatch, making their hiding place visible. Claire and Ray go to the surface to cover and hide their shelter but Zoe, using a homemade periscope, spots a humanoid figure in the distance. Disregarding her mother's rules, Zoe climbs through the barricade to the surface to warn her parents of the Breather. She manages to warn them and they all go back into the shelter, but are followed. Claire, Ray and Zoe try to keep quiet but Zoe's doll, Olive, gets caught on a nearby pipe screw and activates, making noises. The Breather attempts to break in. Others join and finally break through the hatch and into the shelter. Claire and Zoe manage to escape through the air duct but Ray is caught and disappears, followed by a spatter of blood. Claire and Zoe run and end up on the highway where they were stopped by the CDC.

In another flashback, two fighter jets fly overhead and bomb the family's town. They rush to a nearby abandoned shelter as the rest of the town's population is decimated by the military. Claire accidentally cuts herself on a rusty piece of iron as she descends into the shelter and notices the flesh around the cut is discolored and her blood black. They deduce that the virus is airborne and they have already been infected.

In the present, on the highway, Claire and Zoe are caught in a net fired from a helicopter. Breathers, actually  American soldiers wearing night vision goggles and re-breather packs, surround them with weapons drawn. The soldiers test Claire and Zoe's blood and interrogate them to find out if there are any others in the vicinity. Afterwards, the soldiers prepare to execute them. Ray suddenly appears and kills one of the soldiers. Ray has black arteries and veins and bloodshot eyes. He incapacitates three more soldiers, demonstrating remarkable physical strength and agility, and is shot multiple times before falling. Claire and Zoe escape from their net, and an enraged Claire transforms like Ray, killing all but one soldier, who injures her. Before he is able to kill Claire, a transformed Zoe appears and exposes the soldier to the air by removing his re-breather, infecting him. Zoe, in her enraged state, almost attacks and kills Claire, but Claire reminds her of their rule to always keep calm. Claire and Zoe sit with Ray during his final moments. Claire notices the helicopter coming back and the two flee.

The two find a sewer system nearby and hide there. They hear someone approaching, who turns out to be Joe, Zoe's friend and next door neighbor. He has survived and leads them to others just like them within the underground sewers. Before Zoe and Claire join the group of infected survivors, Zoe notes how they managed to survive to day 302 while looking at the sun rising through a nearby window. Claire says "Not days," implying that their days are really "miracles", something Ray called each day at the beginning of the film. Claire looks up into the window before climbing through the sewer hole, revealing her blood shot eyes.

Cast 
 Alexander Skarsgård as Ray
 Andrea Riseborough as Claire
 Emily Alyn Lind as Zoe
 Heather Doerksen as Jillian

Production

Filming 
Principal photography on the film began on August 15, 2012 in Vancouver, British Columbia, Canada.

Reception 

Hidden had a limited release and has received few reviews. Daniel Kurland calls it "a very promising, controlled debut feature from Matt and Ross Duffer." It accomplishes what it sets out to do, and does so "in a creative, minimalist manner." Nav Qateel, writing for Influx Magazine, gives the film a grade of "B", calling it a "polished thriller-horror" and "an accomplished film with a satisfying conclusion. It's also very much a grown-up, mature movie that's a far cry from the typical low-budget offerings we're more accustomed to."

References

External links 
 
 

2015 films
2015 directorial debut films
2015 thriller drama films
American psychological thriller films
American thriller drama films
2015 psychological thriller films
Warner Bros. films
Films shot in Vancouver
Films about viral outbreaks
Films produced by Roy Lee
Films produced by Mason Novick
Films produced by Richard D. Zanuck
Films scored by David Julyan
2015 drama films
Vertigo Entertainment films
2010s English-language films
2010s American films
Films set in bunkers